The 1890 Rochester Broncos season was the team's only season in Major League Baseball. In 1889, the team had played in the minor league International Association as the Rochester Jingoes. The Broncos went 63–63 during the season and finished 5th in the American Association. They went 40–22 at home, but 23–41 on the road. After the season, the team returned to the minor leagues, moving to the Eastern Association as the Rochester Hop Bitters.

Regular season 

Harry Lyons led the league in at bats and in outs. Sandy Griffin was tied for 4th in the league in doubles. Jimmy Knowles was 4th in RBIs. Ted Scheffler was 2nd in stolen bases, 4th in hit by pitches, and tied for 4th in bases on balls. 

Bob Barr was 1st in the league in walks issued and tied for 1st in games lost. Barr was 2nd in the league in games pitched, games started, complete games, batters faced, hits allowed, earned runs, and innings pitched. He was 4th in wins and in wild pitches. He was 5th in strikeouts and tied for 5th in shutouts.

The team had the third best ERA in the league. At 17, Harvey Blauvelt was the league's youngest player.

Season standings

Record vs. opponents

Roster

Player stats

Batting

Starters by position 
Note: Pos = Position; G = Games played; AB = At bats; H = Hits; Avg. = Batting average; HR = Home runs; RBI = Runs batted in

Other batters 
Note: G = Games played; AB = At bats; H = Hits; Avg. = Batting average; HR = Home runs; RBI = Runs batted in

Pitching

Starting pitchers 
Note: G = Games pitched; IP = Innings pitched; W = Wins; L = Losses; ERA = Earned run average; SO = Strikeouts

Other pitchers 
Note: G = Games pitched; IP = Innings pitched; W = Wins; L = Losses; ERA = Earned run average; SO = Strikeouts

Relief pitchers 
Note: G = Games pitched; W = Wins; L = Losses; SV = Saves; ERA = Earned run average; SO = Strikeouts

External links 
1890 Rochester Broncos at Baseball Reference

Rochester Broncos season